Jalaluddin bin Alias (Jawi: جلال الدين بن ألياس; is a Malaysian politician who has served as the Member of Parliament (MP) for Jelebu since May 2018. He served as the Deputy Minister of Federal Territories in the Barisan Nasional (BN) administration under former Prime Minister Ismail Sabri Yaakob and former Minister Shahidan Kassim from August 2021 to the collapse of the BN administration in November 2022, Chairman of the UDA Holdings Berhad from May 2020 to 2021, Member of the Negeri Sembilan State Executive Council (EXCO) in the Barisan Nasional (BN) state administration under former Menteri Besar Mohamad Hasan from May 2013 to the collapse of the BN state administration in May 2018 and Member of the Negeri Sembilan State Legislative Assembly (MLA) for Pertang from May 2013 to May 2018 as well as for Kelawang from March 2004 to March 2008. He is a member of the United Malays National Organisation (UMNO), a component party of the BN coalition.

Politics 

Jalaluddin contested Pertang assembly state in 2013 general election and he won that seat. After election, he was appointed as state executive councillor for Urban Wellbeing, Housing and Local Government under leadership of Menteri Besar, Mohamad Hasan.

He contested Jelebu parliamentary seat in 2018 and won that seat. He succeeded Zainudin Ismail, who died due to complications from a brain tumour he suffered previous year.

Election results

Honours 
  :
  Commander of the Order of Kinabalu (PGDK) – Datuk (2007)
  :
  Knight Commander of the Order of Loyalty to Negeri Sembilan (DPNS) – Dato' (2014)
  :
  Grand Commander of the Order of the Territorial Crown (SMW) – Datuk Seri (2021)

References 

 Nombor aduan Whatsapp: +6019-652 4444

Commanders of the Order of Kinabalu 
Living people
People from Negeri Sembilan
Malaysian people of Malay descent
Malaysian Muslims
United Malays National Organisation politicians
Members of the Dewan Rakyat
21st-century Malaysian politicians
1963 births